The 2014 Heartland Championship was the ninth edition of the Heartland Championship, a rugby union competition involving the twelve amateur rugby unions in New Zealand. The tournament involved a round-robin stage in which the twelve teams played eight games each and then the top four advanced to the Meads Cup semifinals, while fifth to eighth advanced to the Lochore Cup semifinals. In both of these knockout stages the top seeds (first and fifth) played at home against the lowest seeds (fourth and eighth), the second highest seeds (second and sixth) played at home against the third highest seeds (third and seventh) and the final had the higher seed play at home against the lower seed.

Teams

The 2014 Heartland Championship will be contested by the following teams.

Pre-season
Two Heartland Championship teams, Thames Valley and Mid Canterbury, challenged Counties Manukau for the Ranfurly Shield in two matches that took place in at Counties Manukau's home ground, ECOLight Stadium in Pukekohe.

Standings

In the case of a two-team tie on points the ranking of teams is decided by:
 (1) the winner of the round robin match between the two provinces; then 
 (2) highest point difference; then 
 (3) most tries scored; then 
 (4) a coin toss.
In the caseof a three-team or more tie on points the ranking of teams is decided by:
 (1) the province with the most wins against other tied provinces in the Round Robin; then 
 (2) if two teams remain tied they shall be ranked according to the criteria listed above, but if more than two teams remain tied, they shall be ranked according to criteria (2) to (4) only.

Round by round

Points scorers

Updated: 10 June 2014

Regular season
The schedule of fixtures was released on 3 April 2014.

Round 1

Round 2

Round 3

Round 4

Round 5

Round 6

Round 7

Round 8

Finals

Semifinals
Meads Cup

Lochore Cup

Finals
Meads Cup

Lochore Cup

See also

2014 ITM Cup
Heartland Championship

References

Heartland Championship
Heartland
Heartland